The quagga mussel (Dreissena rostriformis, also known as Dreissena bugensis or Dreissena rostriformis bugensis) is a species (or subspecies) of freshwater mussel, an aquatic bivalve mollusk in the family Dreissenidae. It has an average lifespan of 3 to 5 years. 

The species is indigenous to the Dnieper River drainage of Ukraine, and is named after the quagga, an extinct subspecies of African zebra, possibly because, like the quagga, its stripes fade out towards the ventral side. 

The invasive quagga mussel is currently of major concern as it spreads in the rivers and lakes of Europe and also in the Great Lakes of North America where it was brought to by overseas shippers that use the Saint Lawrence Seaway.

Appearance
The quagga mussel shell is generally black, yellow, and/or zig-zagged. However, a large range of shell morphologies is seen, including a distinct morph in Lake Erie that is pale or completely white. The shell has a rounded carina and a convex ventral side.  

The quagga mussel resembles the zebra mussel, just as its namesake (quagga) resembles the zebra. The quagga mussel shell can be distinguished from the zebra mussel shell because it is paler toward the end of the hinge.

Diet
The quagga mussel is a filter feeder; it uses its cilia to pull water into its shell cavity through an incurrent siphon, where the desirable particulate matter is removed. Each adult mussel is capable of filtering one liter or more of water each day, where they remove phytoplankton, zooplankton, algae, and even their own veligers. Any undesirable particulate matter is bound with mucus, known as pseudofeces, and ejected out the incurrent siphon. The particle-free water is then discharged out the excurrent siphon.

Reproduction
The quagga mussel is a prolific breeder, possibly contributing to its spread and abundance. Dreissena spp. are dioecious (either male or female) with external fertilization. A fully mature female mussel is capable of producing up to one million eggs per year. After fertilization, pelagic microscopic larvae, or veligers, develop within a few days and these veligers soon acquire minute bivalve shells. Free-swimming veligers drift with the currents for 3 to 4 weeks feeding by their hair-like cilia while trying to locate suitable substrata to settle and secure byssal threads. Mortality in this transitional stage from planktonic veliger to settled juvenile may exceed 99%. In 2019, the genome of a quagga mussel from the Danube River in Austria was sequenced, revealing how larvae use a system of intercellular 'cleavage cavities' and an expanded set of aquaporin transmembrane water channels for osmoregulation in low-salinity freshwater environments during the early stages of their development.

Invasive species

Europe
Quagga mussels are presumed to have originated in the Ukrainian section of the Black Sea and probably began to spread further into eastern Europe in the 1940s. Today, they are an invasive species found throughout western Europe.

In Romania, quagga mussels were first found in 2004 in the Danube River. In Germany, quagga mussels were first identified in 2005, and now populate many inland waters, such as the Rhine–Main–Danube Canal, the Main, and the Rhine. They were first identified in Switzerland in 2015, and in Lake Constance in 2016, where they have since spread massively and caused considerable problems, in particular to the machinery in waterworks.

In 2014, the species was reported at Wraysbury Reservoir, not far from London's Heathrow Airport in the valley of the River Thames.

In Ireland, the mussels were first discovered in 2021 in two lakes on the River Shannon: Lough Derg and Lough Ree. The mussel is expected to compete with existing zebra mussels and native species, becoming widespread due to its ecological tolerance and suitability to Irish climatic conditions.

North America
Zebra mussels, the first dreissenid mussel introduced in North America, rapidly spread throughout many major river systems and the Great Lakes, causing substantial ecological and environmental impacts. The quagga mussel was first observed in North America in September 1989, when it was discovered in Lake Erie near Port Colborne, Ontario. It was not identified as a distinct species until 1991. By 2021 the biomass of quaggas in the lower 4 Great Lakes was estimated to be so great as to become the primary regulator of phosphorus, remetabolizing and recirculating it instead of allowing it to sedimentize as normal.

The introduction of both dreissenid species into the Great Lakes appears to be the result of ballast water discharge from transoceanic ships that were carrying veligers, juveniles, or adult mussels. The genus Dreissena is highly polymorphic and prolific with high potential for rapid adaptation attributing to its rapid expansion and colonization. Still,  other factors can aid in the spread of these species across North American waters, such as larval drift in river systems or fishing and boating activities that allow for overland transport or movement between water basins. The success of overland transport of Dreissena species depends on their ability to tolerate periods of desiccation, and results suggest that given temperate summer conditions, adult Dreissena mussels may survive 3-5 days of aerial exposure.

Quaggas are prodigious water filterers, removing substantial amounts of phytoplankton and suspended particulates from the water. By removing the phytoplankton, quaggas, in turn, decrease the food source for zooplankton, therefore altering the food web. Impacts associated with the filtration of water include increases in water transparency, decreases in mean chlorophyll concentrations, and accumulation of pseudofeces. Water clarity increases light penetration, causing a proliferation of aquatic plants that can change species dominance and alter the entire ecosystems. The pseudofeces that are produced from filtering the water accumulate and impact the environment. As the waste particles decompose, oxygen is used up, water acidity increases (decreased pH), and toxic byproducts are produced. In addition, quagga mussels accumulate organic pollutants within their tissues to levels more than 300,000 times greater than concentrations in the environment, and these pollutants are found in their pseudofeces, which can be passed up the food chain, therefore increasing wildlife exposure to organic pollutants.  Another major threat involves the fouling of native freshwater mussels. Since quaggas were discovered in Lake Michigan in 1998, plankton rings formed by the passage of storms have been eaten away by the quagga mussels, threatening the local ecosystem.

Each coin-sized quagga can filter up to a liter of water per day, stripping away the plankton that for thousands of years directly and indirectly sustained the native fish.  Much of that food supply has now been sucked to the lake bottom; for every pound of prey fish swimming in the lake today, an estimated three to four pounds of quaggas are clustering on the lake bed.

Dreissena'''s ability to rapidly colonize hard surfaces causes serious economic problems. These major biofouling organisms can clog water-intake structures, such as pipes and screens, therefore reducing pumping capabilities for power and water-treatment plants, costing industries, companies, and communities. Recreation-based industries and activities have also been impacted; docks, breakwalls, buoys, boats, and beaches have all been heavily colonized. Many of the potential impacts of Dreissena are unclear due to the limited time scale of North American colonization. Nonetheless, the genus Dreissena clearly is highly polymorphic and has a high potential for rapid adaptation to extreme environmental conditions, possibly leading to significant long-term impacts on North American waters. Also, the colonization of deeper water by D. r. bugensis, exposes the quagga to a new range of environmental conditions and new habitats.

It causes many of the same problems (stripping life-supporting algae, damaging boats, power plants, and harbors and destroying the native mussel population) as the equally invasive zebra mussel of Russia. It is also displacing native burrowing amphipod (Diporeia hoyi) from the deep waters of Lake Erie.

In January 2007, quagga mussels were discovered at a marina in the Nevada portion of Lake Mead, and two other lakes on the Colorado River, Lake Mohave and Lake Havasu.

In 2008, the threat of quagga mussels being introduced at Lake Casitas and Westlake Lake in California from recreational boating resulted in the lakes' banning the use of outside boats. As of March 2008, other lakes such as Castaic and Lake Cachuma are considering similar bans. In June 2008, the mussels were confirmed in Lake Granby, Colorado. Larval quagga mussels were found in the water. After 5 years of negative testing Lake Granby, Colorado has been classified as a negative waterbody for quagga mussel veligers. 

Quagga mussels are now in all parts of Lake Powell on the Utah and Arizona border. They were also suspected in Deer Creek Reservoir at the top of Provo Canyon in Utah, but this body of water has since been delisted as a quagga-suspected water after 3 years of negative testing.

Quagga mussels as prey
In 1994, invasive-species biologist Anthony Ricciardi determined that North American yellow perch found the invasive dreissenid species palatable. In 2004, he determined that yellow perch, over the intervening 10 years, had developed an appetite for the quagga mussel. While this sounds like good news, the problem is that this feeding process introduces contaminants into the food chain, notably Clostridium botulinum''. 

Redear sunfish, a specialized mollusk-eating fish, are now being stocked in the Colorado River drainage as a defense against the quaggas. As with the yellow perch, this predator–prey relationship could cause toxins and micro-organisms to move up the food chain.

Although quaggas are edible for humans, eating them is not recommended due to the accumulation of toxins, pollutants, and microorganisms within the mussels' bodies.

References

External links 
Dreissena bugensis - Small blurb on Quagga mussel (with pic) on Anthony Ricciardi's site. Links to various papers and blurbs on other invasive species.
CISR Quagga Mussels Info - A brief fact sheet on information on Quagga and Zebra Mussels.
 GLANSIS Species Fact Sheet, United States Geological Survey
 Species Profile - Quagga Mussel (Dreissena bugensis), National Invasive Species Information Center, United States National Agricultural Library. Lists general information and resources for Quagga Mussel.

Dreissenidae
Molluscs described in 1897